Francis Elrington Ball, known as F. Elrington Ball (1863–1928), was an Irish author and legal historian, best known for his work The Judges in Ireland 1221–1921 (1926).

Life

A younger son of John Thomas Ball (1815 to 1898), the Lord Chancellor of Ireland from 1875 to 1880, and his wife Catherine Elrington, daughter of Charles Richard Elrington, Ball was unsuccessful in seeking election (as a Unionist) to Parliament at the 1900 general election in South Dublin, although the split in the Unionist vote did manage to unseat the more moderate Unionist sitting MP, Horace Plunkett. His father had represented Dublin University in Parliament from 1868 to 1875.

Ball is, however, best known for his scholarship, particularly for his work on Swift, the local history of Dublin and on the history of the judiciary in Ireland from 1221 to 1921. The destruction of the Four Courts in 1922, during the Civil War, and of the public records and legal archives it contained (especially those of the Irish Public Records Office) made Ball's prior research into the history of the Irish judiciary up to 1921 particularly valuable to later scholars. The review published in the Irish Law Times & Solicitors' Journal described it as "a truly marvellous condensation of judicial history involving the exhaustive study of a long period, the earlier part of which was hitherto obscure." The same review characterised Ball as "a writer of great care and accuracy, whose work is always characterised by minute and diligent research."

Ball was also a governor of the Blue Coat School, Oxmantown, Dublin. He lived for many years on Booterstown Avenue, Blackrock, County Dublin. As a staunch Unionist, he was strongly opposed to the Irish War of Independence, and, in 1920, he moved to England, where he spent his last years, although at the time of his death he was visiting Dublin. He married Florence Hamilton, who died in 1913; they had no children.

Works as author

 

 

 

 

 Part 1 (1902) Monkstown, Kill-of-the-Grange, Dalkey, Killiney, Tully, Stillorgan, and Kilmacud. 
 Part 2 (1903) Donnybrook, Booterstown, St. Bartholomew, St. Mark, Taney, St. Peter, and Rathfarnham. 
 Part 3 (1905) Tallaght, Cruagh, Whitechurch, Kilgobbin, Kiltiernan, Rathmichael, Old Connaught, Saggart, Rathcoole, and Newcastle.  
 Part 4 (1906) Clonsilla, Leixlip, Lucan, Aderrig, Kilmactalway, Kilbride, Kilmahuddrick, Esker, Palmerston, Ballyfermot, Clondalkin, Drimnagh, Crumlin, St. Catherine, St. Nicholas Without, St. James, St. Jude, and Chapelizod, as well as within the Phoenix Park.
 Part 5 (1917) Howth and its owners.
 Part 6 (1920) Castleknock, Mulhuddart, Cloghran, Ward, St. Margaret, Finglas, Glasnevin, Grangegorman, St. George, and Clonturk.

Works as editor

References

  vi, 208, 211, 275.

1863 births
1928 deaths
19th-century Irish people
Writers from Dublin (city)
19th-century Irish historians
20th-century Irish historians
Irish antiquarians
Irish Anglicans
Irish legal writers
Legal historians